Deshan Dias (born 12 March 1992) is a Sri Lankan cricketer. He made his first-class debut for Lankan Cricket Club in the 2011–12 Premier Trophy on 5 February 2012.

In April 2018, he was named in Galle's squad for the 2018 Super Provincial One Day Tournament.

References

External links
 

1992 births
Living people
Sri Lankan cricketers
Badureliya Sports Club cricketers
Bloomfield Cricket and Athletic Club cricketers
Burgher Recreation Club cricketers
Colts Cricket Club cricketers
Lankan Cricket Club cricketers
Sportspeople from Moratuwa
Alumni of St. Sebastian's College, Moratuwa